The 561st Volksgrenadier Division was a division of the Wehrmacht active during World War II. When it was formed in July 1944, it was originally designated as the 561st Grenadier Division.

History
The 561st Grenadier Division was raised in July 1944 and placed under the leadership of Major General Walter Gorn on 21 July 1944. The division was sent to occupy the central sector of the Eastern Front, which was rapidly diminishing due to the successes of the Soviet's Red Army. In October 1944, the division was re-designated the 561st Volksgrenadier Division. 
In January of 1945 The 561st division took part in the Battle of Königsberg and eventually surrendered after the Soviet troops were victorious.

See also
 List of German divisions in World War II

Commanding officers
The following officers commanded the 561st Volksgrenadier Division:
 Generalmajor Walter Gorn: 21 July 1944
 Colonel Felix Becker: 1 March 1945 – end of war

References

Citations

Bibliography

External links
 Axis History Database

Volksgrenadier divisions
Military units and formations established in 1944
Military units and formations disestablished in 1944